Moneyrea Primary School, officially known as, Moneyrea Primary School and Nursery, is a co-educational, primary school in Moneyreagh, Northern Ireland.

The school is located in the centre of Moneyreagh and is a small school, with approximately 200 pupils.

History 
Moneyrea PS originally opened in the mid-1700s, where the original school met in Moneyrea Presbyterian Church.

In 1822, Moneyrea National School replaced this.

In 1901, the Lyttle Memorial School was built by public subscription, in memorial of Rev. Richard Lyttle.

Nursery unit 
In 2018, Moneyrea Primary School opened its nursery unit, following the closure of the previous nursery unit known as Toddle In Pre-school Playgroup, which had been there for over 30 years. It enrolls 28 part-time pupils.

References 

Primary schools in County Down
1961 establishments in Northern Ireland